John Charles McAdams (October 26, 1945 – April 15, 2021) was an American associate professor of political science at Marquette University. McAdams taught courses on American politics and public policy, voter behavior, and the John F. Kennedy assassination; he ran a website on the assassination and has published a book on the subject, JFK Assassination Logic: How to Think about Claims of Conspiracy (2011). He described himself as "a debunker by temperament".  McAdams was suspended by Marquette in 2014 for publicly criticizing a graduate student.  McAdams filed suit for breach of contract and in 2018 the Wisconsin Supreme Court ordered the university to reinstate him.

Biography

Early life and education 
McAdams attended Kennedy High School in Kennedy, Alabama. He gained an undergraduate degree from the University of Alabama and a masters from Teachers College, Columbia University. He earned his PhD from Harvard University in 1981.

Career
McAdams taught courses on American politics and public policy and the John F. Kennedy assassination and has been published in the American Journal of Political Science, Journal of Politics, Sociological Quarterly, and Law and Contemporary Problems.

McAdams maintained The Kennedy Assassination Home Page, a web page of articles, resources, and links devoted to debunking various conspiracies regarding the assassination.  The site has been called "impressively comprehensive", "the best gateway to serious and reliable materials" and "the best collection of Kennedy assassination-related information."  He was also the moderator of the Usenet group alt.assassination.jfk.  He is the author of the book JFK Assassination Logic: How to Think about Claims of Conspiracy (2011).

Controversy 
On December 12, 2014, McAdams was placed on indefinite academic leave from Marquette University and was suspended from all teaching and faculty duties, banned from campus but retaining pay and benefits. This indefinite suspension came about after McAdams publicly called out a graduate student and instructor by name, in a post on his private blog. He said the instructor had refused to allow a student in an ethics class to talk about gay marriage in class. A letter from Marquette University indicated that the firing was the result of his thrice violating student privacy and deliberately publishing students' names and information to target them for harassment, and because he had done so in the third instance, despite previously acknowledging that posting student names was a matter of concern.

On March 24, 2016, Marquette released an announcement detailing the decision of University President Michael Lovell, formally implementing the unanimous recommendation contained in a 123-page report composed by the Faculty Hearing Committee after a 4-day investigation. McAdams' suspension was extended until January 2017 without pay but with benefits, and any return was conditioned on his writing a full letter of apology by April 4, 2016. McAdams told local news media that the requirement to write an apology was "a deal killer. No, I`m not going to do that." The announcement triggered a barrage of hateful and threatening messages and emails directed at the graduate student and at Marquette University officials. The graduate student later transferred to another university, saying she feared for her safety.

On April 4, 2016, McAdams issued a 4-page letter to President Lovell, formally rejecting his demands, and calling them "compelled speech."

McAdams filed a lawsuit against Marquette, alleging that the suspension and pending dismissal amounted to a breach of contract. In response the university released the 123-page Faculty Hearing Committee report, which alleged a pattern of bullying and reckless behavior by McAdams, including at least three previous attempts to intimidate fellow faculty members by threatening to publish their names to his blog.

In July 2018, the Wisconsin Supreme Court ordered the university to reinstate him. Following a sabbatical, McAdams returned to the university in 2019.

Death 
McAdams died on April 15, 2021.

Politics
McAdams has been described as a "vocal conservative" and was a proponent of capital punishment. In 2006, he testified before the Constitution, Civil Rights and Human Rights Subcommittee of the United States Senate Committee on the Judiciary as an expert on capital punishment.

McAdams ran the blog Marquette Warrior which was linked, along with several other blogs, to a pro-Walmart PR effort.

Books
 JFK Assassination Logic: How to Think about Claims of Conspiracy, Potomac Books, 2011
 The New Class in Post-Industrial Society, Palgrave Macmillan, 2015

References

External links
 Marquette faculty page
 The Kennedy Assassination Home Page
 Marquette Warrior blog
 

1945 births
2021 deaths
American male non-fiction writers
American political writers
Critics of conspiracy theories
Marquette University faculty
University of Alabama alumni
Teachers College, Columbia University alumni
Harvard University alumni
People from Lamar County, Alabama
Political science educators
Researchers of the assassination of John F. Kennedy
Writers from Alabama
American bloggers
21st-century American non-fiction writers
American male bloggers